Otjomuru is a settlement in the Kunene Region of north-western Namibia, situated   east of Okangwati. It belongs to the Epupa electoral constituency. The settlement was founded by Libertina Amathila as a place of resettlement for Ovatue people and Ovatjimba people. It features a primary school that  had 117 learners.

References

Populated places in the Kunene Region